Super Discount 3 is the fourth studio album by French DJ and producer Étienne de Crécy, released on 16 January 2015 through Pixadelic, A+lso and Sony Music. The album is the third in de Crécy's Super Discount series and follows 2004's Super Discount 2.

The album includes collaborations with Madeline Follin of Cults, Pos & Dave, Alex Gopher, Tom Burke, Julien Delfaud, Kilo Kish and Baxter Dury.

Background
Super Discount 3 marks the first time de Crécy has worked with singers, and combines samples and synthesizers, which Crécy used separately on Super Discount (1996) and Super Discount 2 (2004) respectively. The songs were recorded quickly and constructed so that de Crécy could play them at his DJ sets.

Critical reception

David Jeffries of AllMusic opined that Super Discount 3 "electro pops and thumps like its predecessor, and offers a variety of moods" with "crafted bits of cool dance [that] offer instant gratification". Reviewing the album for The Arts Desk, Caspar Gomez found the album melds "fizzing 21st-century electro-pop that's the calling card of everyone from Robyn to La Roux with a bangin' four-to-the-floor club agenda".

Guido Farnell of The Music wrote that the album contains "instantly gratifying dancefloor kicks", and while "Thick beats and rubbery bass are his trademark[, ...] this time around De Crécy has worked with vocalists achieving an almost electro-pop vibe on this release". Michael Smith of Renowned for Sound felt that "the album is full of strong instrumentals with memorable hooks and little tricks to differentiate tracks" with strong melodies "and some curveballs [...] thrown throughout, some great and some less so".

Track listing

Charts

References

2015 albums
Étienne de Crécy albums
Sony Music France albums